Robert Louis Gibson (born June 19, 1957) is an American former professional baseball player who pitched in the Major Leagues from - for the Milwaukee Brewers and New York Mets.

He played collegiate baseball at Bloomsburg University of Pennsylvania. He was signed by the Milwaukee Brewers as an amateur free agent in 1979. He also played in Japan at the end of his career.

External links

1957 births
Living people
Baseball players from Pennsylvania
Bloomsburg Huskies baseball players
Major League Baseball pitchers
Milwaukee Brewers players
New York Mets players
Yakult Swallows players